Joseph Louis Diorio (August 6, 1936 – February 2, 2022) was an American jazz guitarist. He performed with Sonny Stitt, Hal Crook, Eddie Harris, Ira Sullivan, Stan Getz, Pat Metheny, Horace Silver, Anita O'Day, and Freddie Hubbard. In recent years he also recorded albums with modern performers including Robben Ford, Gary Willis, David Becker and Mick Goodrick.

Following in the footsteps of an uncle, Diorio took up the guitar, studying formally in the early 1950s at a local music school. He worked for a while with local bands, but in the early 1960s he ventured into New York City, where he played with several jazz musicians.

In April 2005 he struggled to regain the full use of his left hand following a stroke he suffered at his West Coast residence in San Clemente.

Diorio taught at the University of Southern California. He was also one of the first instructors for the Guitar Institute of Technology. He published several instructional books and videos, and released ten albums under his name.

He died on February 2, 2022, at the age of 85.

Discography

As leader
 Rapport with Wally Cirillo (Spitball, 1974)
 Solo Guitar (Spitball, 1975)
 Straight Ahead to the Light with Steve Bagby (Spitball, 1976)
 Soloduo with Wally Cirillo (Spitball, 1976)
 Peaceful Journey (Spitball, 1977)
 Bonita (Zdenek, 1980)
 Feedles with Gijs Hendriks, Bert Van Erk, Michael Baird (Timeless, 1980)
 20th Century Impressions with Jeff Berlin, Vinnie Colaiuta (J Disc, 1981)
 Earth Moon Earth (Nocturne, 1987)
 Minor Elegance with Robben Ford (MGI, 1989)
 Italy (MGI, 1989)
 Double Take with Riccardo Del Fra (RAM, 1993)
 We Will Meet Again (RAM, 1993)
 Rare Birds with Mick Goodrick (RAM, 1993)
 More than Friends (RAM, 1994)
 The Breeze and I with Ira Sullivan (RAM, 1994)
 Narayani Joe DiOrio and Hal Crook (RAM, 1994)
 To Jobim with Love (RAM, 1996)
 I Remember You (RAM, 1998)

As sideman
With Pete & Conte Candoli
 The Candoli Brothers (Essential Media Group, 1978)

With Eddie Harris
 Exodus to Jazz (Vee-Jay, 1961)
 Mighty Like a Rose (Vee-Jay, 1961)
 Jazz for "Breakfast at Tiffany's" (Vee-Jay, 1961)
 A Study in Jazz (Vee-Jay, 1962)
 For Bird and Bags (Exodus, 1963)
 Come on Down (Atlantic, 1970)

With Sam Lazar
 Playback (Argo, 1962)

With Anita O'Day
 Mello'day (GNP Crescendo, 1978)

With Horace Silver
 Guides to Growing Up (Silveto, 1981)

With Sonny Stitt
 Move on Over (Argo, 1963)
 My Main Man (Argo, 1964) with Bennie Green

With Ira Sullivan
 Ira Sullivan (A&M, 1976) with Jaco Pastorius
 Peace (Fantasy, 1978)
 Multimedia (Galaxy Music, 1982)
 An axe to grind (Ken Tamplin and friends album) (Intense records, 1990)

 With David Becker
 The Color Of Sound (Acoustic Music Records, 2005)

Notes

External Links
 

1936 births
2022 deaths
20th-century American guitarists
20th-century American male musicians
People from Waterbury, Connecticut
American jazz guitarists
Cadet Records artists
American male guitarists
Jazz musicians from Connecticut
American male jazz musicians
University of Southern California faculty